Rhagada is a genus of air-breathing land snails, terrestrial pulmonate gastropod mollusks in the subfamily Hadrinae of the family Camaenidae.

Species 
Species within the genus Rhagada include:
 Rhagada abbasi Köhler, 2014
 Rhagada angulata Solem, 1997
 Rhagada barrowensis M. S. Johnson, Stankowski, Whisson, Teale & Hamilton, 2013
 Rhagada basedowana Iredale, 1939
 Rhagada biggeana Köhler, 2011
 Rhagada bulgana Solem, 1997
 Rhagada capensis Solem, 1997
 Rhagada colona (Martens, 1878)
 Rhagada construa Iredale, 1939
 Rhagada convicta (Cox, 1870)
 Rhagada crystalla Solem, 1985
 Rhagada cygna Solem, 1997
 Rhagada dominica Köhler, 2011
 Rhagada dringi (L. Pfeiffer, 1846)
 Rhagada elachystoma (Martens, 1878)
 Rhagada felicitas Köhler, 2011
 Rhagada floresiana (Martens, 1891)
 Rhagada gatta Iredale, 1939
 Rhagada gibbensis Solem, 1985
 Rhagada globosa Solem, 1997
 Rhagada harti Solem, 1985
 Rhagada karajarri Burghardt & Köhler, 2015
 Rhagada kessneri Köhler, 2011
 Rhagada marghitae Falconieri, 1995
 Rhagada mimika Iredale, 1939
 Rhagada ngurrana M. S. Johnson, Stankowski, Kendrick, Hamilton & Teale, 2016
 Rhagada pilbarana Solem, 1997
 Rhagada primigena Köhler, 2011
 Rhagada radleyi Preston, 1908
 Rhagada reinga (L. Pfeiffer, 1846)
 Rhagada richardsonii (E. A. Smith, 1874)
 Rhagada setzeri Maassen, 2009
 Rhagada sheai Köhler, 2011
 Rhagada solorensis (E. von Martens, 1863)
 Rhagada supracostulata (Schepman, 1892)
 Rhagada sutra Iredale, 1939
 Rhagada tescorum 
 Rhagada torulus (Férussac, 1820)
 Rhagada worora Burghardt & Köhler, 2015

References 

 Köhler, F. (2014). On the land snail Rhagada Albers, 1860 (Gastropoda: Camaenidae) from across the Lesser Sunda Islands. Raffles Bulletin of Zoology. 62: 115–123.

External links
 Albers, J. C.; Martens, E. von. (1860). Die Heliceen nach natürlicher Verwandtschaft systematisch geordnet von Joh. Christ. Albers. Ed. 2. Pp. i-xviii, 1-359. Leipzig: Engelman
 Iredale, T. (1938). A basic list of the land Mollusca of Australia. Part III. The Australian Zoologist. 9: 83-124
  Iredale, T. (1939). A review of the land Mollusca of Western Australia. Records of the Western Australian Museum. 2(1): 1-88, pls 1-5

 
Camaenidae